Rob Chernoff (born 13 August 1965) is a Canadian former swimmer. He competed in the men's 200 metre individual medley at the 1984 Summer Olympics.

References

External links
 

1965 births
Living people
Canadian male medley swimmers
Olympic swimmers of Canada
Swimmers at the 1984 Summer Olympics
Sportspeople from Regina, Saskatchewan